Jack Graham (born June 30, 1950) is the pastor of Prestonwood Baptist Church in Plano, Texas.

Early life and education
Born in Conway, Arkansas, near Little Rock, young Graham was baptized as a professed believer in Jesus Christ at First Baptist Church in his hometown. From there, his life took a steady course into Christian ministry that continued during his formative years in Fort Worth, Texas, where he graduated from Eastern Hills High School. 

In 1970, at the age of twenty, he was ordained pastor of his first church, married and halfway through Hardin-Simmons University in Abilene, Texas, where he earned a Bachelor of Science degree with honors.

By 1976, he and his wife, Deb, had one son, and Graham was associate pastor of Sagamore Hill Baptist Church in Fort Worth, pastored by G. Fred Swank. That year he also completed work for a Master of Divinity degree with honors from Southwestern Baptist Theological Seminary in Fort Worth. Four more years went by, and Graham received a Doctor of Ministry degree in “Church and Proclamation.”

Career

Graham began his ministry as pastor of East Side Baptist in Cross Plains in Callahan County, Texas (1970–1971). Following his associate pastorate at Sagamore Hill Baptist Church (1972–1975), he went on to pastor First Baptist Church in Hobart, Oklahoma (1975–1978), First Baptist Church in Duncan, Oklahoma (1978–1981), and First Baptist Church in West Palm Beach, Florida (1981–1989).

In 1989, Prestonwood Baptist Church, a Dallas megachurch with approximately 11,000 members, called Graham as pastor after its founding pastor, Bill Weber, admitted to an extramarital affair and resigned. Weber unsuccessfully sought to regain his old post, then convinced several of the church's wealthier membersincluding cosmetics magnate Mary Kay Ashto support a new church he was starting.

Despite this, Prestonwood's membership rolls grew by 2,000 members annually, and it was apparent that it had outgrown its location in Far North Dallas.

In 2006, Prestonwood opened its second campus in Prosper, near U.S. Highway 380 and Dallas Parkway. That same year, the church also completed a new children's wing and updated its facilities for PowerPoint Ministries, including an upgrade to High Definition (HDTV).

The church reached the 43,000-member mark in 2018, with regular attendance at worship services averaging about 17,000.

Graham has served two terms as president of the Southern Baptist Convention, the largest American Baptist denomination, with 16 million members, and as president of the SBC Pastor's Conference. Paul Pressler, the retired judge from Houston who was a leading figure in the Southern Baptist Convention Conservative resurgence in 1979, served in 2002 as the first vice-president with Graham as the SBC president.

Pastor Graham served as Honorary Chairman of the 2015 National Day of Prayer and was a member of President Donald Trump's Religious Advisory Council. He participated in the National Prayer Service at the Washington National Cathedral the day after the inauguration.

In May 2022, Dr. Graham was named in a report on sex abuse in the Southern Baptist Convention, which stated that he allowed a youth music minister at Prestonwood Baptist Church, John Langworthy, who had admitted to church officials that he had molested at least one student in the late 1980s, to be removed quietly, without notifying police. Langworthy was able to go on to become a youth music minister at Morrison Heights Baptist Church in Clinton, Mississippi, where he was later accused of abusing young boys again.

Theological views
Graham's theological views reflect the Southern Baptist Convention's Baptist Faith and Message (2000 edition).

Published works
You Can Make a Difference (1992)
Diamonds in the Dark (1997)
Lessons from the Heart (2001)
A Hope and a Future (2002)
Life According to Jesus (2004)
A Man of God (2005)
Courageous Parenting (2006)
Are You Fit for Life? (2007)
A Daily Encounter With God (2009)
Powering Up (2009)

See also

List of Southern Baptist Convention affiliated people
Southern Baptist Convention
Southern Baptist Convention Presidents

References

External links
Jack Graham website

1950 births
Baptist writers
Living people
People from Conway, Arkansas
People from Fort Worth, Texas
Southern Baptist ministers
Southern Baptist Convention presidents
Prestonwood Baptist Church
Baptists from Arkansas